This article contains a discography of Constellation Records.

Releases
 CST001/SIS001: Sofa, New Era Building 7", 1997
 CST002: Sofa, Grey, 1997
 CST003: Godspeed You! Black Emperor, F♯A♯∞ [1995-1997], 1997
 CST004: Exhaust, Exhaust, 1998 (CD: 2000)
 CST005: Do Make Say Think, Do Make Say Think, 1998
 CST006: Godspeed You! Black Emperor, Slow Riot for New Zero Kanada E.P., 1999
 CST007: Sackville, The Principles of Science 10", 1999
 CST008: Fly Pan Am, Fly Pan Am, 1999
 CST009: A Silver Mt. Zion, He Has Left Us Alone but Shafts of Light Sometimes Grace the Corner of Our Rooms…, 2000
 CST010: Do Make Say Think, Goodbye Enemy Airship the Landlord Is Dead, 2000
 CST011: Fly Pan Am, Sédatifs en fréquences et sillons, 2000
 CST012: Godspeed You! Black Emperor, Lift Yr. Skinny Fists Like Antennas to Heaven, 2000
 CST013: Frankie Sparo, My Red Scare, 2000
 CST014: 1-Speed Bike, Droopy Butt Begone!, 2000
 CST: Donovan Gince, Le Retour, 2000
 CST015: Re:, Mnant, 2001
 CST016: Hangedup, Hangedup, 2001
 CST017: Frankie Sparo, Arena Hostile, 2001
 CST018: A Silver Mt. Zion (as The Silver Mt. Zion Memorial Orchestra & Tra-La-La Band), Born into Trouble as the Sparks Fly Upward, 2001
 CST019: Fly Pan Am, Ceux qui inventent n'ont jamais vécu (?), 2002
 CST020: Do Make Say Think, & Yet & Yet, 2002
 CST021: Exhaust, Enregistreur, 2002
 CST022: Hangedup, Kicker in Tow, 2002
 CST023: Frankie Sparo, Welcome Crummy Mystics, 2003
 CST024: Godspeed You! Black Emperor, Yanqui U.X.O., 2002
 CST025: Do Make Say Think, winter hymn country hymn secret hymn, 2003
 CST026, Polmo Polpo, Like Hearts Swelling, 2003
 CST027: A Silver Mt. Zion (as The Silver Mt. Zion Memorial Orchestra & Tra-La-La Band with Choir), "This Is Our Punk-Rock," Thee Rusted Satellites Gather + Sing,, 2003
 CST028: Elizabeth Anka Vajagic, Stand with the Stillness of this Day, 2004
 CST029: Black Ox Orkestar, Ver Tanzt?, 2004
 CST030, A Silver Mt. Zion (as Thee Silver Mountain Reveries), The "Pretty Little Lightning Paw" E.P., 2004
 CST031, Fly Pan Am, N'Écoutez Pas, 2004
 CST032: Re:, alms, 2004
 CST033: A Silver Mt. Zion (as Thee Silver Mt. Zion Memorial Orchestra & Tra-La-La Band); Horses in the Sky, 2004
 CST: Matthew, Anthony, & Elizabeth: Sing Christmas Songs, 2004
 CST034: Hangedup, Clatter For Control, 2005
 CST035: Elizabeth Anka Vajagic, Nostalgia/Pain EP, 2005
 CST036: Hrsta, Stem Stem in Electro, 2005
 CST: Elizabeth Donovan, Sings, 2005
 CST037: Glissandro 70, Glissandro 70, 2006
 CST038: Black Ox Orkestar, Nisht Azoy, 2006
 CST039: Not used. Rumoured to be reserved for an album titled 'Elegies Plays War Radio'
 CST040: Feu Thérèse, Feu Thérèse, 2006
 CST041: Carla Bozulich, Evangelista, 2006
 CST042: Sandro Perri, Plays Polmo Polpo, 2006
 CST043: Eric Chenaux, Dull Lights, 2006
 CST044: Lullabye Arkestra, Ampgrave, 2006
 CST045: Do Make Say Think, You, You're a History in Rust, 2007
 CST046: Vic Chesnutt, North Star Deserter, 2007
 CST047: Sandro Perri, Tiny Mirrors, 2007
 CST048: Hrsta, Ghosts Will Come and Kiss Our Eyes, 2007
 CST049: Feu Thérèse, Ça Va Cogner, 2007
 CST: Donovan Gince, Donovan Gince, 2007
 CST: Andrew Donovan, Praise, 2007
 CST050: Evangelista, Hello, Voyager, 2008
 CST051: A Silver Mt. Zion (as Thee Silver Mt. Zion Memorial Orchestra & Tra-La-La Band); 13 Blues for Thirteen Moons, 2008
 CST052: Eric Chenaux, Sloppy Ground, 2008
 CST053: The Dead Science, Throne of Blood (The Jump Off), 2008
 CST054: The Dead Science, Villainaire, 2008
 CST055: Tindersticks, The Hungry Saw, 2008
 CST056: Jem Cohen with Vic Chesnutt and Silver Mount Zion, Empires of Tin DVD, 2009
 CST057: Clues, Clues, 2009
 CST058: Land of Kush, Against The Day, 2009
 CST059: Elfin Saddle, Ringing for the begin again, 2009
 CST060: Vic Chesnutt, At The Cut, 2009
 CST061: Evangelista/Carla Bozulich, Prince of Truth, 2009
 CST062: Do Make Say Think, Other Truths, 2009
 CST063: A Silver Mt. Zion (as Thee Silver Mt. Zion Memorial Orchestra); Kollaps Tradixionales, 2010
 CST064: Clues, Endless Forever 7", 2009
 CST065: Tindersticks, Falling Down A Mountain, 2010
 CST066: Land Of Kush's Egyptian Light Orchestra, Monogamy, 2010
 CST067: Siskiyou, Siskiyou, 2010
 CST068: Eric Chenaux, Warm Weather with Ryan Driver, 2010
 CST069: Elfin Saddle, Wurld, 2010
 CST070: Les Momies De Palerme, Brulez Ce Coeur, 2010 (Part of Musique Fragile 01)
 CST071: Khora, Silent Your Body Is Endless, 2010 (Part of Musique Fragile 01)
 CST072: Nick Kuepfer, Avestruz, 2010 (Part of Musique Fragile 01)
 CST073: Colin Stetson, Righteous Wrath, 2010
 CST074: Pat Jordache, Radio Generation 7", 2011
 CST075: Colin Stetson, New History Warfare Vol.2: Judges, 2011
 CST076: Pat Jordache, Future Songs, 2011
 CST077: Tindersticks, Claire Denis Film Scores 1996-2009, 2011
 CST078: Efrim Manuel Menuck, Plays "High Gospel", 2011
 CST079: Matana Roberts, COIN COIN Chapter One: Gens de couleur libres, 2011
 CST080: Esmerine, La Lechuza, 2011
 CST081: Godspeed You! Black Emperor, 'Allelujah! Don't Bend! Ascend!, 2012
 CST082: Evangelista, In Animal Tongue, 2011
 CST083: Siskiyou, Keep Away the Dead, 2011
 CST084: Colin Stetson, Those Who Didn't Run, 2011
 CST085: Sandro Perri, Impossible Spaces, 2011
 CST086: Tindersticks, The Something Rain, 2012
 CST087: Elfin Saddle, Devastates, 2012
 CST088: Eric Chenaux, Guitar and Voice, 2012
 CST089: Kanada 70, Vamp Ire, 2012
 CST090: Pacha, Affaires Étrangères, 2012
 CST091: Hangedup & Tony Conrad, Transit of Venus, 2012
 CST092: Colin Stetson, New History Warfare Vol. 3: To See More Light, 2013
 CST093: Jerusalem In My Heart, Mo7it Al-Mo7it, 2013
 CST094: Saltland, I Thought It Was Us But It Was All Of Us, 2013
 CST095: Sarah Neufeld, Hero Brother, 2013
 CST096: Esmerine, Dalmak, 2013
 CST097: Land Of Kush, The Big Mango, 2013
 CST098: Matana Roberts, COIN COIN Chapter Two: Mississippi Moonchile, 2013
 CST099: A Silver Mt. Zion, Fuck Off Get Free We Pour Light On Everything, 2014
 CST101: Sandro Perri, Spaced Out EP, 2013
 CST102: Carla Bozulich, Boy, 2014
 CST103: Ought, More Than Any Other Day, 2014
 CST104: Hiss Tracts, Shortwave Nights, 2014
 CST105: A Silver Mt. Zion, Hang On To Each Other EP, 2014
 CST106: Avec Le Soleil Sortant De Sa Bouche, Zubberdust!, 2014
 CST107: Last Ex, Last Ex, 2014
 CST108: Ought, Once More With Feeling EP, 2014
 CST109: Siskiyou, Nervous, 2015
 CST110: Matana Roberts, COIN COIN Chapter Three: River Run Thee, 2015
 CST111: Godspeed You! Black Emperor, Asunder, Sweet and Other Distress, 2015
 CST112: Eric Chenaux, Skullsplitter, 2015
 CST113: Colin Stetson and Sarah Neufeld, Never Were The Way She Was, 2015
 CST114: Jerusalem In My Heart, If He Dies, If If If If If If, 2015
 CST115: Ought, Sun Coming Down, 2015
 CST116: Esmerine, Lost Voices, 2015
 CST117: Off World, 1, 2016
 CST118: Automatisme, Momentform Accumulations, 2016
 CST119: Jason Sharp, A Boat Upon Its Blood, 2016
 CST121: Avec Le Soleil Sortant De Sa Bouche, Pas pire pop, I Love You So Much, 2017
 CST122: The Infected Mass, Those Who Walk Away, 2017
 CST123: Saltland, A Common Truth, 2017
 CST124: Jessica Moss, Pools Of Light, 2017
 CST125: Joni Void, Selfless, 2017
 CST126: Godspeed You! Black Emperor, Luciferian Towers, 2017
 CST127: Off World, 2, 2017
 CST128: Esmerine, Mechanics Of Dominion, 2017
 CST129: Efrim Manuel Menuck, Pissing Stars, 2018
 CST130: Jason Sharp, Stand Above The Streams, 2018
 CST131: Eric Chenaux, Slowly Paradise, 2018
 CST132: Carla Bozulich, Quieter, 2018
 CST133: Alanis Obomsawin, Bush Lady, 2018
 CST134: Joyfultalk, Plurality Trip, 2018
 CST135: Automatisme, Transit, 2018
 CST136: Sandro Perri, In Another Life, 2018
 CST137: Jerusalem In My Heart, Daqa'iq Tudaiq, 2018
 CST138: Jessica Moss, Entanglement, 2018
 CST139: Light Conductor, Sequence One, 2019
 CST140: Joni Void, Mise En Abyme, 2019
 CST141: Deadbeat & Camara, Trinity Thirty, 2019
 CST142: Siskiyou, Not Somewhere, 2019
 CST143: Lungbutter, Honey, 2019
 CST144: Efrim Manuel Menuck & Kevin Doria, are SING SINCK, SING, 2019
 CST145: Matana Roberts, COIN COIN Chapter Four: Memphis, 2019
 CST146: Land of Kush, Sand Enigma, 2019
 CST147: Fly Pan Am, C'est ça, 2019
 CST148: Sandro Perri, Soft Landing, 2019
 CST149: Rebecca Foon, Waxing Moon, 2020
 CST150: JOYFULTALK, A Separation Of Being, 2020
 CST151: T. Griffin, The Proposal, 2021
 CST152: Markus Floats, Third Album, 2020
 CST153: T. Gowdy, Therapy With Colour, 2020
 CST154: Jason Sharp, The Turning Centre Of A Spinning World, 2021 
 CST155: Fly Pan Am, Frontera, 2021
 CST156: Godspeed You! Black Emperor, G_d’s Pee AT STATE’S END!, 2021
 CST157: Sofa, Source Crossfire, 2021
 CST158: Jerusalem in My Heart, Qalaq, 2021
 CST159: Light Conductor, Sequence Two, 2021
 CST160: Eric Chenaux, Say Laura, 2022
 CST161: Jessica Moss, Phosphenes, 2021
 CST162: Kee Avil, Crease, 2022

Compilations
 CST1COMP: A Silver Mt. Zion, Frankie Sparo, Re:, Exhaust, Hangedup, Sofa, Fly Pan Am, 1-Speed Bike, Sackville, Do Make Say Think, Music Until Now, 2002
 CST2COMP: Elizabeth Anka Vajagic, Do Make Say Think, Exhaust, Hangedup, Black Ox Orkestar, Sackville, Silver Mt Zion, Sofa, Polmo Polpo, Re:, Fly Pan Am, 1-Speed Bike, Frankie Sparo, Godspeed You! Black Emperor, Song of the Silent Land, 2004
 CSTMF01: Musique Fragile Volume 01: Les Momies De Palerme / Khôra / Nick Kuepfer, 2010
 CSTMF02: Musique Fragile 02: Kanada 70 / Pacha / Hangedup & Tony Conrad, 2012

References
 http://www.cstrecords.com - Constellation Records' official site
 http://www.brainwashed.com/godspeed/music.html - Detailed discography of Godspeed You! Black Emperor and "other projects" including A Silver Mt. Zion. (Text-only version)
 http://boomkat.com/downloads/377899-pat-jordache-radio-generation-radar

See also
 List of record labels
 Constellation Records

Discography
Discographies of Canadian record labels